The 2012 Dallas Tennis Classic was a professional tennis tournament played on hard courts. It was the first edition of the tournament, which was part of the 2012 ATP Challenger Tour. It took place in Irving, Texas, United States between 12 and 18 March 2012.

Singles main-draw entrants

Seeds

 1 Rankings are as of March 5, 2012.

Other entrants
The following players received wildcards into the singles main draw:
  Benjamin Becker
  Amer Delić
  Tommy Haas
  John Nallon

The following players received entry from the qualifying draw:
  Frank Dancevic
  Thomas Fabbiano
  Alex Kuznetsov
  Mischa Zverev

Doubles main-draw entrants

Seeds

1 Rankings as of March 5, 2012.

Other entrants
The following pairs received wildcards into the doubles main draw:
  Amer Delić /  Alex Pier
  Sasha Ermakov /  Shane Vinsant
  Adham El-Effendi /  Darren Walsh

The following pairs received entry as alternates into the doubles main draw:
  Vincenzo Santopadre /  Potito Starace

Champions

Singles

 Frank Dancevic def.  Igor Andreev, 7–6(7–4), 6–3

Doubles

 Santiago González /  Scott Lipsky def.  Bobby Reynolds /  Michael Russell, 6–4, 6–3

References

External links
Official Website
ATP Official Site

Dallas Tennis Classic
Irving Tennis Classic
Dallas Tennis